Gary Peters (born 1958) is a U.S. Senator from Michigan since 2015. Senator Peters may also refer to:

Andrew James Peters (1872–1938), Massachusetts State Senate
Deb Peters (born 1974), South Dakota State Senate
Douglas J. J. Peters (born 1963), Maryland State Senate
Jesse Peters (1897–1962), Wisconsin State Senate
Robert Peters (politician), Illinois State Senate
Samuel R. Peters (1842–1910), Kansas State Senate
Thomas Minott Peters (1810–1888), Alabama State Senate
William Thompson Peters (1805–1885), Connecticut State Senate

See also
George Peter (politician, died 1893) (1829–1893), Maryland State Senate